Press Play is the second mini-album by the South Korean boy band BtoB. It was released on September 12, 2012, with the track "Wow" as the lead single. "Lover Boy" was chosen as the follow-up single and will be used to promote the EP starting on October 18.

Background
A teaser image confirming the release was revealed by Cube Entertainment's Twitter account on September 4, 2012, along with the release date of the EP, September 12, the title track of the EP, titled "Wow" and the EP's name, titled Press Play. The image has a pop art theme and also shows the person on the photo making the word 'WOW' with their hands and mouth. It was later revealed that the person on the photo is the member Sungjae. On September 5, an audio teaser of the song "Wow" was released on BtoB's YouTube account. One day later, on September 6, Cube revealed teaser photos of the group together, as well solo shots of every member. On September 7, a teaser from the music video of "Wow" was released. On September 12, the EP and music video of "Wow" were released digitally simultaneously.

Concept
According to Cube Entertainment, the concept of Press Play is an "idea of the "play" button on a cassette tape player and the meaning of the title is derived from the indication that "BtoB play time is about to begin"".

Composition
The EP consists of six new tracks. The first track of the EP, "Press Play", was written and composed by Seo Yong-bae, Seo Jae-woo and by the singer G.NA, who also features on the song. The song is described as a song that has a literal meaning of enjoying music by pressing the play button. The second track, "Wow", also first title track of the EP, was written and composed by Kim Do-hyun, Seo Yong-bae and Seo Jae-woo. The song is described to be of "new jack swing" style, which was popular during the '90s, and incorporates the solid vocal and rap skills of the members. The third track, "Lover Boy", chosen as the follow-up track of promotions, was also written and composed by Kim Do-hyun, Seo Yong-bae and Seo Jae-woo. The song is described to also have the '90's retro sound embedded in the track. The fourth track, "U & I", was written by Hwang Sung-jin and composed by Lee Joo-hyung and Lim Sang-hyuk. It is described to demonstrate a sentimental, yet innocent teen-age love story. The fifth track, "Stand Up", was written by Gum and composed by Choi Yong-chan. It is described to inspire and give strength to all listeners who are looking forward to a better tomorrow. The sixth and last track of the EP, "My Girl", was written and composed by Triple A. It is described to be filled with BtoB's distinct vocal color  accompanied by the sound of an acoustic guitar.

Promotions
The promotions of the EP with the track "Wow" started on September 13, on Mnet's music show M! Countdown. The song was also promoted on the shows Music Bank, Music Core, Inkigayo, Show Champion and SBS MTV The Show. A song titled "Dream", not included on the EP, was used on the comeback week of performances as an interlude for the performance of "Wow". The current last performance of "Wow" was on SBS' Inkigayo, on October 14. The group started promoting the song "Lover Boy" on October 18, on Mnet's M! Countdown.

Track listing

Chart performance

Album chart

Sales and certifications

Release history

References

External links 
 
 
 
 
 
 
 

Cube Entertainment EPs
Dance-pop EPs
2012 EPs
BtoB (band) EPs
Korean-language EPs